Vägen genom Skå is a 1957 Swedish drama film directed by Hans Dahlin.

Cast
 Eva Stiberg as Inga
 Erik Strandmark as Walter
 Lasse Sarri as Dockan
 Ann-Charlotte Bergman as Anna
 Barbro Hiort af Ornäs as Emma
 Björn Berglund as Anders Torstensson
 Rud Falne as Jurre
 Franko Mariano as Angelo
 Sven Almgren as Gunne
 Ingemar Pallin as Svenne
 Arne Källerud as Björn

References

External links
 

1957 films
1957 drama films
Swedish drama films
1950s Swedish-language films
1950s Swedish films